The Road to Mother (Anaǵa aparar jol) is a 2016 Kazakhstani drama film directed by Akan Satayev. It was selected as the Kazakhstani entry for the Best Foreign Language Film at the 90th Academy Awards, but it was not nominated.

Cast
 Bolat Abdilmanov
 Berik Aitzhanov
 Adil Akhmetov
 Aruzhan Jazilbekova
 Altynai Nogherbek

See also
 List of submissions to the 90th Academy Awards for Best Foreign Language Film
 List of Kazakhstani submissions for the Academy Award for Best Foreign Language Film

References

External links
 

2016 films
2016 drama films
Kazakh-language films
Kazakhstani drama films